The Nautical Training Corps (NTC) is a National Maritime Training and Uniformed Youth Organisation based in the south of England. Registered Charity Number: 306084, Cadets follow similar rates and ranks, traditions, values and ethos as the British Royal Fleet Auxiliary (RFA) and the Merchant Navy.

The Founder

Frank Froëst-Carr, the son of a Scotland Yard police inspector, joined the Royal Navy as a 15-year-old boy entrant in the closing years of sail. He joined HMS Lion, at HMNB Devonport, a training ship for boy entrants. He completed his initial training in HMS Implacable, before joining HMS Nautilus for deep-sea training.

After leaving the service in 1926 he joined the Royal Naval Volunteer Reserve. He rose to Lieutenant Commander, later resigning his commission to start a new career in the Youth Service.

In 1973 the value of his service to youth was recognised by the award of an OBE. In 1975, he published "Spun Yarn & Bell Bottoms", a story of life on the lower deck in an old square-rigged training ship in the early years of the last century, and on a steam cruiser up to the end of World War I.

History

The NTC’s first ‘unit’ was Training Ship Nautilus in Brighton, based at the old Richmond Road School. The unit took its name from HMS Nautilus, which had been Froëst-Carr's first seagoing ship in the Royal Navy. TS Nautilus is still open and serving local youth in Brighton.

This unit comprised 140 cadets and just 2 other officers. "First Brighton Division" was followed by "First London Division", TS Enterprise. The first National HQ was based at Pavilion Buildings, Brighton, underneath Brighton Chess Club and by the entrance to the Royal Pavilion. It later moved to the Old Shoreham Road and Shoreham Harbour.

The Corps spread throughout the south of England and beyond, particularly in Sussex, Hampshire and south London; there have also been units as far afield as Acton, Northampton, Milton Keynes and Derby. In all there have been over 64 units, or ‘Training Ships’, but the exact number is unknown as the records of some units have been lost over time. These have included an all-girl unit at TS Tudor Rose, and an all-boy unit, TS Collingwood, both at Langley Green in Crawley. All training ships have been named after serving or previous ships belonging to the Royal Navy.

References

See also
 Girls' Nautical Training Corps
 Sea Cadet Corps (United Kingdom)

Naval Cadet organisations
Youth organisations based in the United Kingdom